The 29th Cannes Film Festival was held from 13 to 28 May 1976. The Palme d'Or went to Taxi Driver by Martin Scorsese. In 1976, "L'Air du temps", a new section which was non-competitive and focused on contemporary subjects, was introduced. This section, along with sections "Les Yeux fertiles" of the previous year and "Le Passé composé" of the next year, were integrated into Un Certain Regard in 1978.

The festival opened with the documentary That's Entertainment, Part II, directed by Gene Kelly, and closed with Family Plot, directed by Alfred Hitchcock.

Jury 
The following people were appointed as the Jury of the 1976 feature film competition:

Feature films
 Tennessee Williams (USA) Jury President
 Jean Carzou (France) (artist)
 Mario Cecchi Gori (Italy)
 Costa-Gavras (France)
 András Kovács (Hungary)
 Lorenzo López Sancho (Spain) (journalist)
 Charlotte Rampling (UK)
 Georges Schehadé (Lebanon) (author)
 Mario Vargas Llosa (Peru)

Official selection

In competition - Feature film
The following feature films competed for the Palme d'Or:

Babatu by Jean Rouch
Brutti, sporchi e cattivi by Ettore Scola
Bugsy Malone by Alan Parker
A Child in the Crowd (Un enfant dans la foule) by Gérard Blain
The Claw and the Tooth (La griffe et la dent) by François Bel
Cría cuervos by Carlos Saura
The Inheritance (L'eredità Ferramonti) by Mauro Bolognini
Kings of the Road (Im Lauf der Zeit) by Wim Wenders
Letters from Marusia (Actas de Marusia) by Miguel Littín
The Marquise of O (Die Marquise von O...) by Éric Rohmer
Monsieur Klein by Joseph Losey
Mrs. Dery Where Are You? (Déryné hol van?) by Gyula Maár
Next Stop, Greenwich Village by Paul Mazursky
Nishaant by Shyam Benegal
Pascual Duarte by Ricardo Franco
Private Vices, Public Pleasures (Vizi privati, pubbliche virtù) by Miklós Jancsó
Shadow of Angels (Schatten der Engel) by Daniel Schmid
Sweet Revenge (Dandy, the All American Girl) by Jerry Schatzberg
Taxi Driver by Martin Scorsese
The Tenant (Le Locataire) by Roman Polanski

Films out of competition
The following films were selected to be screened out of competition:

 1900 (Novecento) by Bernardo Bertolucci
 Anna by Alberto Grifi, Massimo Sarchielli
 Ascension by Olivier Dassault
 Bobby by Marty Ollstein
 The California Reich by Walter F. Parkes, Keith F. Critchlow
 Confidences of the Night (L'amour blessé) by Jean Pierre Lefebvre
 A Delicate Balance by Tony Richardson
 Edvard Munch by Peter Watkins
 Les enfants des autres by Martin Pierlot
 Face to Face by Ingmar Bergman
 Family Plot by Alfred Hitchcock
 Grey Gardens by David Maysles, Albert Maysles, Ellen Hovde, Muffie Meyer
 Hedda by Trevor Nunn
 Hollywood... Hollywood! by Gene Kelly
 The Iceman Cometh by John Frankenheimer
 Illustrious Corpses (Cadaveri eccelenti) by Francesco Rosi
 Labirintus by András Kovács
 The Memory of Justice by Marcel Ophüls
 Notes Towards an African Orestes (Appunti per un'Orestiade Africana) by Pier Paolo Pasolini
 Orlando furioso by Luca Ronconi
 La Pharmacie-Shangaï by Joris Ivens, Marceline Loridan
 Le pont de singe by André Harris, Alain De Sedouy
 Sartre par lui-même by Alexandre Astruc, Michel Contat
  by Peter Stein
 Train Landscape by Jules Engel

Short film competition
The following short films competed for the Short Film Palme d'Or:

Agulana by Gérald Frydman
Babfilm by Ottó Foky
Hidalgo by Ion Truica
High Fidelity by Antoinette Starkiewicz
Metamorphosis by Barry Greenwald
Nightlife by Robin Lehman
Perfo by Jean Paul Cambron
Rodin mis en vie by Alfred Brandler
La Rosette arrosée by Paul Doppf
La Syncope by Edouard Niermans

Parallel sections

International Critics' Week
The following feature films were screened for the 15th International Critics' Week (15e Semaine de la Critique):

 Before the Time Comes (Le Temps de l’avant) by Anne Claire Poirier (Canada)
 Une Fille unique by Philippe Nahou (France)
 Der Gehulfe by Thomas Koerfer (Switzerland)
 Harvest: 3,000 Years by Haile Gerima (Ethiopia)
 Iracema: Uma Transa Amazônica by Jorge Bodansky, Orlando Senna (Brazil, West Germany, France)
 Mélodrame by Jean-Louis Jorge (France)
 Tracks by Henry Jaglom (USA)

Directors' Fortnight
The following films were screened for the 1976 Directors' Fortnight (Quinzaine des Réalizateurs):

 Anno Domini 1573 (Seljačka buna 1573) by Vatroslav Mimica (Yugoslavia)
 The Battle of Chile (La Batalla de Chile: El golpe de estado) by Patricio Guzman (Chile, Cuba)
 Behindert by Stephen Dwoskin (West Germany, United Kingdom)
 Le berceau de cristal by Philippe Garrel (France)
 O Casamento by Arnaldo Jabor (Brazil)
 The Devil's Playground by Fred Schepisi (Australia)
 Le diable au cœur by Bernard Queysanne (France)
 Duelle by Jacques Rivette (France)
 Four Days to Death (Cetiri dana do smrti) by Miroslav Jokic (Yugoslavia)
 Giliap by Roy Andersson (Sweden)
 Gitirana (doc.) by Jorge Bodansky, Orlando Senna (Brazil)
  by Werner Schroeter (West Germany, France)
 Hollywood on Trial (doc.) by David Helpern Jr. (United States)
 In the Realm of the Senses (L'Empire des sens) by Nagisa Oshima (France, Japan)
 Les Nomades by Sid Ali Mazif (Algeria)
 Os Demónios de Alcácer Quibir by José Fonseca e Costa (Portugal)
 A Pacemaker and a Sidecar (L'Eau chaude, l'eau frette) by André Forcier (Canada)
 Son nom de Venise dans Calcutta désert by Marguerite Duras (France)
  by Alexander Kluge (West Germany)
 Normande (La tête de Normande St-Onge) by Gilles Carle (Canada)
 We Have Many Names (We har manje namn) (doc.) by Mai Zetterling (Sweden)

Short films

 L'enfant prisonnier by Jean-Michel Carré (France)
 The Labyrinth Tale (Meikyū-tan) by Shuji Terayama (Japan)
 Leonina by Jean-Paul Courraud (France)
 Les Stars by Serge Lutens (France)
 Pierre Molinier - 7 Rue Des Faussets by Noël Simsolo (France, Luxembourg)
 Walter by Serge Dubor (France)

Awards

Official awards
The following films and people received the 1976 Official selection awards:
Palme d'Or: Taxi Driver by Martin Scorsese
Grand Prix:
Cría cuervos by Carlos Saura
Die Marquise von O... by Éric Rohmer
Best Director: Ettore Scola for Brutti, sporchi e cattivi
Best Actress:
Dominique Sanda for L'eredità Ferramonti
Mari Törőcsik for Déryné hol van?
Best Actor: José Luis Gómez for Pascual Duarte
Short films
Short Film Palme d'Or: Metamorphosis by Barry Greenwald
Jury Prize: Agulana by Gérald Frydman & Nightlife by Robin Lehman

Independent awards
FIPRESCI
 FIPRESCI Prize:
 Kings of the Road by Wim Wenders (Unanimously) (In competition)
  by Alexander Kluge
Commission Supérieure Technique
Technical Grand Prize: Michel Fano (sound) for The Claw and the Tooth (La Griffe et la dent)

References

Media
INA: Opening of the 1976 festival (commentary in French)
INA: The wonders of the music hall at Cannes (commentary in French)

External links 
1976 Cannes Film Festival (web.archive)
Official website Retrospective 1976
Cannes Film Festival:1976  at Internet Movie Database

Cannes Film Festival, 1976
Cannes Film Festival, 1976
Cannes Film Festival